Randi Martinsen is an American geologist who spent much of her career as a senior lecturer in the Department of Geology and Geophysics at the University of Wyoming. Prior to her work at the University of Wyoming, she worked as an exploration and production geologist for Cities Service Company in Denver, Colorado. Martinsen became a consultant in 1979 when she moved to Laramie, Wyoming. She has extensively worked on the Western Interior Cretaceous basin with a particular interest in stratigraphic trap exploration, paleotectonic influences on depositional systems, and clastic reservoir characterization. Martinsen is a former president and the second woman ever elected to head the American Association of Petroleum Geologists Foundation (AAPG), an organization that provides educational programs, scientific research, and engineering services in communities around the world. She was president of AAPG from 2014-2015.

Personal life and education
Martinsen was born and raised in New York City. She spent most of her summers as a child in the Ramapo Mountains of New Jersey, which sparked her interest in the natural world.

Five years after starting work at Cities Service Company in Denver, she married Jim Steidtmann, a geology professor at the University of Wyoming.

In 1971, she received her Bachelor of Science (BS) in Earth and Space Science at the State University in Stony Brook, New York. In 1975, she completed her MS in geology at Northern Arizona University; she was the only woman in her class.

Martinsen spent most of her career as a senior lecturer at the University of Wyoming for the petroleum geology program, before retiring in 2015. The courses she taught included physical geology, advanced stratigraphy, petroleum geology, methods in petroleum geology, and topics in geology. Throughout her career, she also taught courses in petroleum geology and engineering, clastic depositional systems, sequence stratigraphy, reservoir characterization, and physical geology.

Martinsen's hobbies include equestrian three-day events, traveling, scuba diving, and skiing. She has two children, Dana and Matt, and one stepchild, David. She has three grandchildren: Lauren, Kaya, and Rylan.

Career
From 1974 to 1979, Martinsen worked as a geologist for the Cities Service Company in Denver, Colorado. Martinsen later worked as a consulting geologist in Laramie, Wyoming from 1980 to 2011. She took up a position as a lecturer at the University of Wyoming's Department of Geology and Geophysics in 1981 and later became a senior lecturer from 1995 to 2014. Throughout her career, Martinsen has provided consulting to industry professionals, basin analysis and reservoir characterization studies, and expert witness testimony. In 2011, Randi Martinsen worked as a principal at Hydrocarbon InSight, LLC. In 2015, Martinsen briefly returned to the University of Wyoming's Department of Geology and Geophysics to work as a lecturer emeritus. She retired in 2015. From 2014 to 2015, Randi Martinsen served as the American Association of Petroleum Geologists' president.

After becoming the first woman to be sworn in as an expert in the Wyoming and Gas Commission in the 1970s, Martinsen was stopped at the Casper Petroleum Club upon entering because she was a woman.  In 1979, Martinsen submitted an abstract to the Rocky Mountain Section American Association of Petroleum Geologists about the Hartzog Draw, a giant oil field. This proposal was rejected because the program chair believed that "it was too important for a female to present." Upon hearing the reason for the rejection, Martinsen fought back by forcing the program chair to reverse his decision and later offered her to present.

Research
Randi Martinsen has made contributions to the field of geology through her research related to the exploration and production of hydrocarbons from stratigraphically trapped accumulations as well as the assessment of the different types and characteristics of reservoir quality rocks found located within the systems of the Cretaceous Western Interior Seaway systems. Here, Martinsen identifies the significance of the remnants of sedimentary rock deposits that originate from an existing depositional system for the construction of accurate stratigraphic frameworks, facies models, and paleogeographic maps. Martinsen studied depositional remnants within the Western Interior of the Cretaceous basin and documented that these remnants have a vastly different geometry compared to the strata located underneath them. Her research emphasized the importance of identifying this phenomenon in relation to the field of petroleum geology on the basis that if depositional systems are not correctly identified, then accurate exploration and production strategies for the reservoirs cannot be developed and, in return, could result in inefficient petroleum extraction from these systems.

Her recent projects include:
 Synsedimentary tectonic influences on basin physiography and depositional regime 
 Sequence stratigraphic analysis and reservoir characterization of the tight gas sands in the Mesaverde Group, Greater River Basin, Wyoming
 Influence of syn-sedimentary faulting on the distribution and reservoir quality of sandstones
While teaching at the University of Wyoming, she was an Ex Officio which she contributed to: Exploration Memoir No. 1, A New Approach to Exploring for Anomalously Pressured Gas Accumulations (2005).

Awards and honors
Martinsen holds many notable credentials in the field of petroleum geology. During her time working with the AAPG Martinsen, she received several honors and awards including the Stratigraphic Compartmentalization of Reservoir Sandstones: Examples from the Muddy Sandstone Power River Basin, Wyoming and Montana, AAPG Memoir 61 (1995), the A.I Levorsen Memorial Award (1979), two Certificates of Merit (2001 and 2006), and the Distinguished Service Award (2009). She was a recipient of WGA's Frank A. Morgan award. She also made history as the first woman sworn in before the Wyoming Oil and Gas Conservation Commission. In a Forbes article written on May 10, 2020, Martinsen is recognized as contributing to the evolution of women in the field of geology. She served as President of the American Association of Petroleum Geologists alongside other outstanding women in the field. This is a profound moment in the history of the organization.

Publications 
Martinsen has published over 25 peer-reviewed articles and presentations with the AAPG and other organizations. The focus of these pertain to depositional system analysis, sequence stratigraphy, tectonics and sedimentation, anomalous pressures, hydrocarbon accumulation, and tight gas sandstones. Along with these topics, Martinsen has also published course notes and field trip guides from her work at the University of Wyoming.

 Martinsen, R.S., 2003, Depositional remnants, part 1: Common components of the stratigraphic record with important implications for hydrocarbon exploration and production: AAPG Bulletin, v. 87, p. 1869-1882
 Martinsen, R.S., 2003, Depositional remnants, part 2: Examples from the Western Interior Cretaceous basin of North America: AAPG Bulletin, v. 87, p. 1883-1909
 Randi S. Martinsen1 (2001). "ABSTRACT: Wave Dominated versus Current Dominated Shorelines in the Cretaceous Western Interior Seaway". AAPG Bulletin. 85.
 OLSON, MARK, RANDI MARTINSEN, DIANE (1999). "Abstract: Improving Reservoir Characterization Techniques with Behind Outcrop Coring and Logging Studies: Preliminary Results of the Rock Springs Drilling Project, Southwestern Wyoming ". AAPG Bulletin. 83.
 MARTINSEN, RANDI S., University of (1998). "Abstract: Depositional Remnants: Products of the Interplay Between Synsedimentary Tectonics and Changes in Relative Sea Level". AAPG Bulletin. 82.
 Martinsen, R.S., 1997, Stratigraphic controls on the distribution of pressure compartments, in R.C. Surdam (ed.), Seals, Traps and the Petroleum System: AAPG Memoir, p. 223-241.
 Randi Martinsen, William Iverson, R (1996). "Facies, Faults and Potential Sweet Spots in a Tight Gas Reservoir: Almond Formation, Wyoming: ABSTRACT". AAPG Bulletin. 80
 Martinsen, Randi S.; Jiao, Zun S.; Iverson, William P.; Surdam, Ron C. (1994). "Paleosol and Subunconformity Traps: Examples from the Muddy Sandstone, Powder River Basin, Wyoming"
 Ole J. Martinsen (2), Randi S. Mart (1993). "Mesaverde Group (Upper Cretaceous), Southeastern Wyoming: Allostratigraphy Versus Sequence Stratigraphy in a Tectonically Active Area". AAPG Bulletin. 77.
 Randi S. Martinsen (1990). "Cretaceous Stratigraphy, Laramie Basin, Southeastern Wyoming: ABSTRACT". AAPG Bulletin. 74.
 TILLMAN, R. W.; MARTINSEN, R. S. (1987), "SEDIMENTOLOGIC MODEL AND PRODUCTION CHARACTERISTICS OF HARTZOG DRAW FIELD, WYOMING, A SHANNON SHELF-RIDGE SANDSTONE", Reservoir Sedimentology, SEPM (Society for Sedimentary Geology), pp. 15–112
 MARTINSEN, R. S.; TILLMAN, R. W. (1985), "HARTZOG DRAW, A NEW GIANT OIL FIELD", Shelf Sands and Sandstone Reservoirs, SEPM (Society for Sedimentary Geology), pp. 349–350
 Roderick W. Tillman, Randi S. Marti (1983). "Possible Tectonic Influence on and Facies Distribution of Shannon Ridge Sandstones, Wyoming: ABSTRACT". AAPG Bulletin. 6
 Martinson, R. S. (1998) Compartmentalization of Sandstone Reservoirs Due to Syndepositional Faulting, Almond Formation, Washakie Basin, Wyoming 
Martinson, R.S. (1989) Haystack Mountains Formation (Randi S. Martinson and Roderick W. Tillman)

References

Living people
American petroleum geologists
American women geologists
University of Wyoming faculty
Scientists from New York City
Stony Brook University alumni
Northern Arizona University alumni
American women academics
21st-century American women
1950 births